El Bien del Obero was a socialist weekly newspaper in Ferrol, Spain. The paper began appearing around 1900.

References

Defunct newspapers published in Spain
Defunct weekly newspapers
Mass media in Ferrol, Spain
Publications with year of establishment missing
Publications with year of disestablishment missing
Spanish-language newspapers
Socialist newspapers